The action of 11 March 1727 was a minor naval engagement of the Anglo-Spanish War.

On 11 March the brand new Spanish 46-gun fifth-rate warship Nuestra Senor Del Rosario was out on sea trials after just being fully completed. The ship was on a journey bound from Santander to Cadiz.

They sighted the Spanish frigate near the port of Cadiz and gave chase. Soon Royal Oak caught up, and after a few broadsides the Spanish warship soon surrendered. Canterbury was not able to get up till just as the Spanish surrendered. The prize was carried with the rest of the squadron, which managed to slip past the besieging Spanish forces to relieve Gibraltar on the 13 March.

Notes

References
Clowes, William Laird. (2003). The Royal Navy: v. 3: A History - From the Earliest Times to 1900. Chatham Publishing. .

Conflicts in 1727
Naval battles involving Spain
Naval battles involving Great Britain
Anglo-Spanish War (1727–1729)